Petro Mykhaylovych Kruk (born 20 March 1985, in Dubno) is a Ukrainian sprint canoer who competed in the late 2000s. At the 2008 Summer Olympics in Beijing, he was eliminated in the semifinals of the C-2 1000 m event.

References
 Sports-Reference.com profile

1985 births
Canoeists at the 2008 Summer Olympics
Living people
People from Dubno
Olympic canoeists of Ukraine
Ukrainian male canoeists
Sportspeople from Rivne Oblast